The British School of Bahrain (BSB) is a selective, coeducational, independent kindergarten-through-Year 13 school for students between the ages of 3 and 18 located in Hamala, Bahrain. The school comprises three sections: the Infants provides for children in Key stage 1, from 3–6 years old; the Juniors for children in Key stage 2, from 7–10 years old, and the Senior School for children from 11 to 18 years old.

History 
The British School of Bahrain was founded in January 1995 by Alex Welford with the aim of providing British education to the expatriates. Originally operating out of a villa in Adliya, the school has since relocated to Hamala where it serves over 2,800 students.

In 2018, the school was acquired by Inspired, an international provider of private schools.

Curriculum

The school follows the National Curriculum for England and Wales with some adaptations to comply with local law and customs. Students sit IGCSE and GCE Advanced Level examinations in year 11 and 13 respectively. BTEC courses are also offered.

Students

As of March 2021, the school has an enrolment of 2,898 students, comprising 88 nationalities, of which 1,023 are seniors, 973 are juniors and 902 are infants. The average class size is 26 students.

School Houses 

The school operates a house system with houses named after four mythical creatures: Pegasus, Phoenix, Dragon and Griffin. Students are allocated to a house upon admission.

Notable alumni

James Arthur, the 2012 winner of the ninth series of the British musical competition The X Factor was a student at the school for four years.

See also 

 List of educational institutions in Bahrain

References

External links
 The British School of Bahrain

International schools in Bahrain
British international schools in Asia